The Redmi 10A is an Android-based smartphone as part of the Redmi series, a sub-brand of Xiaomi Inc. This phone was announced on March 29, 2022.

References 

Android (operating system) devices
Phablets
10A
Mobile phones introduced in 2022
Mobile phones with multiple rear cameras